Engengele Airport  is an airport serving the Congo River village of Engengele in Mongala Province, Democratic Republic of the Congo.

See also

 Transport in the Democratic Republic of the Congo
 List of airports in the Democratic Republic of the Congo

References

External links
 OpenStreetMap - Engengele
 OurAirports - Engengele Airport
 Engengele Airport
 

Airports in Mongala